Cristina Bucșa was the defending champion but withdrew from the tournament.

Anhelina Kalinina won the title after Océane Dodin retired in the final at 7–6(7–4), 1–0.

Seeds

Draw

Finals

Top half

Bottom half

References

Main Draw

Engie Open Nantes Atlantique - Singles